William Fall (26 October 1900 – 1965) was an English professional footballer who played as a wing half for Sunderland.

References

1900 births
1965 deaths
Footballers from South Shields
English footballers
Association football wing halves
Sunderland A.F.C. players
West Stanley F.C. players
English Football League players